Nodocapitus is a genus of velvet worms in the family Peripatopsidae. All species in this genus have 15 pairs of legs in both sexes. N. formosus is found in Queensland, Australia, N. inornatus is found in New South Wales, and N. barryi is found in both of these states. In each species, the males are distinguished by enlarged papillae on the head, between the antennae.

Species 
The genus contains the following species:

 Nodocapitus barryi Reid, 1996
 Nodocapitus formosus Reid, 1996
 Nodocapitus inornatus Reid, 1996

References

Further reading 
 

Onychophorans of Australasia
Onychophoran genera
Taxa named by Amanda Reid (malacologist)